Her Bleeding Heart is a lost 1916 silent film drama directed by Jack Pratt and produced by the Lubin Manufacturing Company, Philadelphia.

Cast
Betty Brice - Marion Lane (*as Rosetta Brice)
Richard Buhler - Dr. George Page
Crauford Kent - Allen Craven
Inez Buck - Lucy Mallory
Karva Poloskova - Sonia Crator
William H. Turner - Mr. Lane (*as William Turner)
Mary Carr - Mrs. Lane (*as Mrs. Carr)

References

External links
 Her Bleeding Heart at IMDb.com

1916 films
American silent feature films
Lost American films
Lubin Manufacturing Company films
American black-and-white films
Silent American drama films
1916 drama films
Films directed by Jack Pratt
1916 lost films
Lost drama films
1910s American films